The Roy Hill mine is an iron ore mine in the Chichester Range in the Pilbara region of Western Australia, located  north of Newman and  south of Port Hedland. Mining operations will produce  of iron ore per annum with an operating life of more than 20 years.

Gina Rinehart's Hancock Prospecting is the majority stakeholder in the project with a 70% interest. The remaining 30% stake is held by a consortium comprising POSCO (12.5%), Marubeni (15%), and China Steel Corporation (2.5%).

Mine development
Project work commenced in mid-2011 and so far major dredging work of the harbour at South West Creek, within Port Hedland's inner harbour has been completed.

Construction of the Ginbata Airport at the mine site and internal mine roads have also been completed, as has clearing of the centre line for the railway. Ginbata Airport is capable of handling Boeing 737 aircraft and will be the hub for transporting the fly-in fly-out workforce.

First shipment of iron ore from the mine commenced in December 2015.

Transport 

A ,  heavy haul, standard gauge railway from the minesite to Port Hedland has been built.

Capital costs to develop the project were estimated to be at least A$7 billion, and the first shipments from the mine were expected in 2015. The construction of the railway commenced in 2012 and was completed after 27 month, in 2015, with the first ore train travelling the line in December 2015. The new railway included eight bridges over waterways and three over roads and rails. The project jointly won the 2016 Railway Project Award of the Railway Technical Society of Australasia, alongside the Auckland Electrification Project. The combined construction cost of the mine, port and rail was A$10 billion, with a daily cost of A$10 million and a work force of 3,000 reported in 2014.

Roy Hill took delivery of the first of 21 ES44ACIs diesel-electric locomotives in January 2015. Eight other locomotives were delivered between 29 January and 1 February 2015 via the vessel Ocean Charger.

A single span rail bridge carrying the Great Northern Highway over the Roy Hill rail line was completed on 15 February 2019.

 Lumsden Point General Cargo Facility is being built at Port Hedland, and there is also work to repair and upgrade facilities for tugboats.

Indigenous inhabitants
The Indigenous inhabitants of the area are the Nyiyaparli people. The Nyiyaparli language is spoken.
The indigenous frequently protest against the exploitation of their land.

See also
Pilbara Railways

References

External links
 
 Roy Hill Iron Ore Mine Images and Info
 MINEDEX website: Roy Hill Iron Ore Database of the Department of Mines, Industry Regulation and Safety

Iron ore mines in Western Australia
Surface mines in Australia
Fortescue River
Shire of East Pilbara